Mardijker is an extinct Portuguese-based creole of Jakarta. It was the native tongue of the Mardijker people. The language was introduced with the establishment of the Dutch settlement of Batavia (present-day Jakarta); the Dutch brought in slaves from the colonies they had recently acquired from the Portuguese, and the slaves' Portuguese creole became the lingua franca of the new city. The name is Dutch for "freeman", as the slaves were freed soon after their settlement. The language was replaced by Betawi creole Malay in Batavia by the end of the 18th century, as the Mardijker intermarried and lost their distinct identity.

The last competent speaker, Oma Mimi Abrahams, died in 2012, and the language survives only in the lyrics of old songs of the genre Keroncong Moresco (Keroncong Tugu).

References

Bibliography

External links 
John Holm, 1989, Pidgins and Creoles: Volume 2, Reference Survey
Batavia Creole by Maurer Philippe at apics-online.info
A small history of Tugu

Portuguese-based pidgins and creoles
Languages of Indonesia
Languages extinct in the 2010s
Portuguese language in Asia
Languages attested from the 18th century
Culture of Jakarta
North Jakarta